Hochmut kommt vor dem Knall is an East German comedy film directed by Kurt Jung-Alsen. It was released in 1960.

External links
 

1960 films
1960 comedy films
German comedy films
East German films
1960s German-language films
1960s German films